Kamilas Perera was a Sri Lankan cricketer. He was a wicket-keeper who played for Moratuwa Sports Club.

Perera made a single first-class appearance for the side, during the 1995–96 season, against Colts Cricket Club. From the upper-middle order, he scored 33 runs in the first innings in which he batted, and 14 runs in the second.

External links
Kamilas Perera at Cricket Archive

Sri Lankan cricketers
Moratuwa Sports Club cricketers
Living people
Place of birth missing (living people)
Year of birth missing (living people)